Ospern is a small town in the commune of Redange, in western Luxembourg.  , the town has a population of 261.

Redange
Towns in Luxembourg